Fructus is a Latin word meaning fruit. It may refer to:

 Fructus (Roman law), a legal term
 Fructus naturales, natural fruits of the land, in property law
 Saint Fructus (died 715), Spanish saint

See also
 
 Fructose, a sugar found in many plants
 Fructuosus (died 259), Christian saint, bishop, and martyr
 Fruit
 Fruto (disambiguation)
 Frutos (disambiguation)